"Tous Ensemble" is a song recorded in 2002 by French singer Johnny Hallyday. The song was released as a single on 23 April 2002. It was the official anthem of the French football team during the 2002 FIFA World Cup. French singer and songwriter Catherine Lara participated in the writing of the lyrics and produced the song. Michel Sanchez, who was member of the band Deep Forest, co-wrote the lyrics. The song became the second football anthem to reach the top of the singles chart in France, four years after Ricky Martin's hit "La Copa de la Vida". "Tous Ensemble" became Hallyday's first number-one hit on the modern French SNEP Singles Chart since its establishment in 1984. As of July 2014, it is the 102nd best-selling single of the 21st century in France, with 303,000 units sold.

The current chart was established in 1984. He had over 20 number-1 hits in 1960s and 1970s.

Track listings
 CD single
 "Tous ensemble" – 2:45
 "Tous ensemble" (instrumental) – 2:45

Certifications

Charts

References

2002 singles
Football songs and chants
Johnny Hallyday songs
SNEP Top Singles number-one singles
Mercury Records singles
Universal Music Group singles
2002 songs
Songs written by Michel Sanchez